A penumbral lunar eclipse took place on Saturday, March 1, 1980, the first of three penumbral lunar eclipses in 1980. This subtle penumbral eclipse may have been visible to a skilled observer at maximum eclipse. 65.455% of the Moon's disc was partially shaded by the Earth (none of it was in total shadow), which caused a gentle shadow gradient across its disc at maximum; the eclipse as a whole lasted 3 hours, 58 minutes and 33.3 seconds.

Visibility 
The penumbral eclipse was visible in northeast in North America, east in South America, Europe, Africa, Asia and Australia, seen rising over the Americas and setting over Asia and Australia.

Related lunar eclipses

Eclipses in 1980 
 A total solar eclipse on Saturday, 16 February 1980.
 A penumbral lunar eclipse on Saturday, 1 March 1980.
 A penumbral lunar eclipse on Sunday, 27 July 1980.
 An annular solar eclipse on Sunday, 10 August 1980.
 A penumbral lunar eclipse on Tuesday, 26 August 1980.

Lunar year series

Half-Saros cycle
A lunar eclipse will be preceded and followed by solar eclipses by 9 years and 5.5 days (a half saros). This lunar eclipse is related to two partial solar eclipses of Solar Saros 149.

See also 
List of lunar eclipses
List of 20th-century lunar eclipses

Notes

External links 
 

1980-03
1980 in science
March 1980 events